An intimate relationship is an interpersonal relationship that involves physical or emotional intimacy. Although an intimate relationship is commonly a sexual relationship, it may also be a non-sexual relationship involving family, friends, or acquaintances.

Emotional intimacy involves feelings of closeness, relatedness, and vulnerability. This concept has been proven to be an essential aspect for a healthy relationship. Once deeper feelings of liking or loving one or more people arise, it may result in physical intimacy. However, emotional intimacy may or may not be present in physical intimacy depending on the depth of the relationship. Physical intimacy is characterized by romantic love, sexual activity, or other passionate attachment. These relationships play a central role in the overall human experience. Humans have a general desire to belong and to love, which is usually satisfied within an intimate relationship. Such relationships allow a social network for people to form strong emotional attachments.

Intimacy 
Intimacy involves the feeling of being in a close, personal association and belonging together. It is a familiar and very close affective connection with another as a result of a bond that is formed through knowledge and experience of the other. Genuine intimacy in human relationships requires dialogue, transparency, vulnerability, and reciprocity. Dalton (1959) discussed how anthropologists and ethnographic researchers access "inside information" from within a particular cultural setting by establishing networks of intimates capable (and willing) to provide information unobtainable through formal channels.

In human relationships, the meaning and level of intimacy varies within and between relationships. In anthropological research, intimacy is considered the product of a successful seduction, a process of rapport building that enables parties to confidently disclose previously hidden thoughts and feelings. Intimate conversations become the basis for "confidences" (secret knowledge) that bind people together.

Sexual relations and moments of intimacy decline significantly after delivering a newborn. Extreme sleep deprivation was the most common response from women on why they are less sexually active with their spouse.  Due to the lack of sleep and obligations of taking care of the baby, sexual intimacy becomes a less significant priority. Women viewed themselves as being unattractive, not because their spouse expressed this, but they are uncomfortable with their appearance of their changed body. Only 5% of partners stated that their sexual relations were more frequent post childbirth. Some women viewed it as important for their marriage regardless of their level of desire. A breast-feeding mother forms a strong emotional bond between her and baby. Many times, the mother's emotional needs are met through this experience. This can cause the husband to feel less connected to his wife.

Sustaining intimacy for a length of time involves well-developed emotional and interpersonal awareness. Intimacy involves the ability to be both separate and together as participants in an intimate relationship. Murray Bowen called this "self-differentiation", which results in a connection in which there is an emotional range involving both robust conflict and intense loyalty. Lacking the ability to differentiate oneself from the other is a form of symbiosis, a state that is different from intimacy, even if feelings of closeness are similar.

Intimate behavior joins family members and close friends, as well as those in love. It evolves through reciprocal self-disclosure and candor. Poor skills in developing intimacy can lead to getting too close too quickly; struggling to find the boundary and to sustain connection; being poorly skilled as a friend, rejecting self-disclosure or even rejecting friendships and those who have them. Psychological consequences of intimacy problems are found in adults who have difficulty in forming and maintaining intimate relationships.  Individuals often experience the human limitations of their partners, and develop a fear of adverse consequences of disrupted intimate relationships.  Studies show that fear of intimacy is negatively related to comfort with emotional closeness and with relationship satisfaction, and positively related to loneliness and trait anxiety.

The interdependence model of Levinger and Snoek divides the development of an intimate relationship into four stages: the first one is the zero contact stage, in which is no contact between the two parties in the relationship; The second stage is awareness, which means the parties do not have any superficial or deep contact with each other, but only know each other; The third stage is surface contact, in which both parties know each other and have had superficial contact; The fourth stage of coexistence phase (mutuality), refers to mutual dependence having greatly increased, as well as deep contact existing.

Scholars distinguish between different forms of intimacy, including physical, emotional, cognitive, or spiritual intimacy:

 Physical intimacy can include being inside someone's personal space, holding hands, hugging, kissing, heavy petting, or other sexual activity.
 Emotional intimacy, particularly in sexual relationships, typically develops after a certain level of trust has been reached and personal bonds have been established. The emotional connection of "falling in love", however, has both a biochemical dimension driven through reactions in the body stimulated by sexual attraction (PEA, phenylethylamine), and a social dimension driven by "talk" that follows from regular physical closeness or sexual union. Love is an important factor in emotional intimacy. It is qualitatively and quantitatively different from liking, and the difference is not merely in the presence or absence of sexual attraction. There are three types of love in a relationship: passionate love, companionate love, and sacrificial love.  Sacrificial love reflects the subsumption of the individual self-will within a union. Companionate love involves diminished potent feelings of attachment, an authentic and enduring bond, a sense of mutual commitment, the profound feeling of mutual caring, feeling proud of a mate's accomplishments, and the satisfaction that comes from sharing goals and perspective. In contrast, passionate love is marked by infatuation, intense preoccupation with the partner, throes of ecstasy, and feelings of exhilaration that come from being reunited with the partner.
 Cognitive or intellectual intimacy takes place when two people exchange thoughts, share ideas and enjoy similarities and differences between their opinions. 
 Spiritual intimacy involves bonding over spirituality.

Research

Empirical research
The use of empirical investigations in 1898 was a major revolution in social analysis. A study conducted by Monroe examined the traits and habits of children in selecting a friend. Some of the attributes included in the study were kindness, cheerfulness and honesty. Monroe asked 2336 children aged 7 to 16 to identify "what kind of chum do you like best?" The results of the study indicated that children preferred a friend that was their own age, of the same sex, of the same physical size, a friend with light features (hair and eyes), friends that did not engage in conflict, someone that was kind to animals and humans, and finally friends that were honest. Two characteristics that children reported as least important included wealth and religion.

The study by Monroe was the first to mark the significant shift in the study of intimate relationships from analysis that was primarily philosophical to those with empirical validity. This study is said to have finally marked the beginning of relationship science. In the years following Monroe's study, very few similar studies were done. There were limited studies done on children's friendships, courtship and marriages, and families in the 1930s but few relationship studies were conducted before or during World War II. Intimate relationships did not become a broad focus of research again until the 1960s and 1970s when there was a vast number of relationship studies being published.

Other studies

The study of intimate relationships uses participants from diverse groups and examines a wide variety of topics that include family relations, friendships, and romantic relationships, usually over a long period. Current study includes both positive and negative or unpleasant aspects of relationships.

Research being conducted by John Gottman (2010) and his colleagues involves inviting married couples into a pleasant setting, in which they revisit the disagreement that caused their last argument. Although the participants are aware that they are being videotaped, they soon become so absorbed in their own interaction that they forgot they were being recorded. With the second-by-second analysis of observable reactions as well as emotional ones, Gottman is able to predict with 93% accuracy the fate of the couples' relationship.

Terri Orbuch and Joseph Veroff (2002) monitored newlywed couples using self-reports over a long period (a longitudinal study). Participants are required to provide extensive reports about the natures and the statuses of their relationships. Although many of the marriages have ended since the beginning of the study, this type of relationship study allows researchers to track marriages from start to finish by conducting follow-up interviews with the participants in order to determine which factors are associated with marriages that last and which with those that do not.  Though the field of relationship science is still relatively young, research conducted by researchers from many different disciplines continues to broaden the field.

Evidence also points to the role of a number of contextual factors that can impact intimate relationships. In a recent study on the impact of Hurricane Katrina on marital and partner relationships, researchers found that while many reported negative changes in their relationships, a number also experienced positive changes. More specifically, the advent of Hurricane Katrina led to a number of environmental stressors (for example, unemployment, prolonged separation) that negatively impacted intimate relationships for many couples, though other couples' relationships grew stronger as a result of new employment opportunities, a greater sense of perspective, and higher levels of communication and support. As a result, environmental factors are also understood to contribute heavily to the strength of intimate relationships.

A Northwestern University research team summarized the literature in 2013, finding that "negative-affect reciprocity" – retaliatory negativity between partners during a conflict – is arguably the most robust predictor of poor marital quality. However, this degradation can be softened (according to their 120 heterosexual couple Chicago sample) by undertaking a reappraisal writing task every four months.

One study suggests that married straight couples and cohabiting gay and lesbian couples in long-term intimate relationships may pick up each other's unhealthy habits.  The study reports three distinct findings showing how unhealthy habits are promoted in long-term intimate relationships:  through the direct bad influence of one partner, through synchronicity of health habits, and through the notion of personal responsibility.

Some research indicates that pornography is a possible source of education about sex and relationships. In the absence of inclusive same-sex relationship education in traditional sources (i.e., schools, parents, friends, and mainstream media), gay pornography may be used by men who have sex with men as a source of information about intimacy, while serving its main purpose as a masturbatory aid. A 2020 study indicated that gay pornography depicts both physical (kissing, cuddling, affectionate touch, and genital touch before and after sex) and verbal intimacy (compliments, personal disclosure, and expressions of care). Most forms of physical and verbal intimacy occurred before or during sex, with intimacy being least evident post-sex.

History

Ancient philosophers: Aristotle

Over 2,300 years ago, interpersonal relationships were being contemplated by Aristotle. He wrote: "One person is a friend to another if he is friendly to the other and the other is friendly to him in return" (Aristotle, 330 BC, trans. 1991, pp. 72–73). Aristotle believed that by nature humans are social beings. Aristotle also suggested that relationships were based on three different ideas: utility, pleasure, and virtue. People are attracted to relationships that provide utility because of the assistance and sense of belonging that they provide. In relationships based on pleasure, people are attracted to the feelings of pleasantness when the parties engage. However, relationships based on utility and pleasure were said to be short-lived if the benefits provided by one of the partners were not reciprocated. Relationships based on virtue are built on an attraction to the others' virtuous character.

Aristotle also suggested that relationships based on virtue would be the longest lasting and that virtue-based relationships were the only type of relationship in which each partner was liked for themselves. The philosophical analysis used by Aristotle dominated the analysis of intimate relationships until the late 1880s.

1880s to early 1900s

Modern psychology and sociology began to emerge in the late 19th century. During this time theorists often included relationships into their current areas of research and began to develop new foundations which had implications in regards to the analysis of intimate relationships. Freud wrote about parent–child relationships and their effect on personality development. Freud's analysis proposed that people's childhood experiences are transferred or passed on into adult relationships by means of feelings and expectations. Freud also founded the idea that individuals usually seek out marital partners who are similar to that of their opposite-sex parent.

In 1891, William James wrote that a person's self-concept is defined by the relationships endured with others. In 1897, Émile Durkheim's interest in social organization led to the examination of social isolation and alienation. This was an influential discovery of intimate relationships in that Durkheim argued that being socially isolated was a key antecedent of suicide. This focus on the darker side of relationships and the negative consequences associated to social isolation were what Durkheim labeled as anomie. Georg Simmel wrote about dyads, or partnerships with two people. Simmel suggested that dyads require consent and engagement of both partners to maintain the relationship but noted that the relationship can be ended by the initiation of only one partner. Although the theorists mentioned above sought support for their theories, their primary contributions to the study of intimate relationships were conceptual and not empirically grounded.

1960s and 1970s
An important shift was taking place in the field of social psychology that influenced the research of intimate relationships. Until the late 1950s, the majority of studies were non-experimental. By the end of the 1960s more than half of the articles published involved some sort of experimental study. The 1960s was also a time when there was a shift in methodology within the psychological discipline itself. Participants consisted mostly of college students, experimental methods and research were being conducted in laboratories and the experimental method was the dominant methodology in social psychology. Experimental manipulation within the research of intimate relationships demonstrated that relationships could be studied scientifically. This shift brought relationship science to the attention of scholars in other disciplines and has resulted in the study of intimate relationships being an international multidiscipline.

1980s to 2000s
In the early 1980s the first conference of the International Network of Personal Relationships (INPR) was held. Approximately 300 researchers from all over the world attended the conference. In March 1984, the first journal of Social and Personal Relationships was published. In the early 1990s the INPR split off into two groups; in April 2004 the two organizations rejoined and became the International Association for Relationship Research (IARR).

Donald Nathanson, a psychiatrist who built his study of human interactions off of the work of Silvan Tomkins, argues that an intimate relationship between two individuals is best when the couple agrees to maximize positive affect, minimize negative affect and allow for the free expression of affect. These findings were based on Tomkin's blueprint for emotional health, which also emphasizes doing as much of the maximizing, minimizing and expressing as possible.

In the year 1993, dating as society knew it was going to change forever. An online company called Match.com was the first dating site to launch. A high correlation exists for those that are computer literate and their tendency to attempt online dating due to the new development of the internet. In 2004, Guinness World Records rewarded Match.com with being the largest dating site in the world by having over 42 million people sign up for their services.

2010s to 2020s 
In the year 2016, there were an estimated 240 million dating app users, but as of 2021 that number has risen to around 323 million users worldwide due to the Covid 19 pandemic. Even though there has been rapid growth of users, there have been many reports of the negative effects regarding dating app usage. The intention of dating app usage varies between each individual. For example, a study of Grindr users was done to detect their reasonings for using that dating site. The final report concluded that 67.2% of users were interested in finding a dating companion while 62.1% of users were desiring casual sex. The risk for sexually transmitted disease increases significantly for individuals who participate in casual sex. A sexual assault researcher from the Associate Dean of Brigham Young University College of Nursing notes that there were around 2,000 cases of reported sexual assaults from dating apps alone over the course of three years. Many of those cases were due to catfishing, which is when one portrays to be someone else. Studies have also been done to determine the effects of online dating on mental health. They found that there is an increase of depression, anxiety, and low self-esteem for users. Regardless of the negative outcomes, the convenience of dating apps makes it so that they are here to stay in society.

See also 

Terms for members of intimate relationships

References

External links

 International Association for Relationship Research
 Process of Adaption in Intimate Relationships

Interpersonal relationships